Gjermundnes is a hamlet in Norway on the east side of the mouth of Tres Fjord in the municipality of Vestnes. It is also the name of the peninsula where the district is located.

The village includes the historic Gjermundnes Farm and an agricultural school, which is the only agricultural school in Møre og Romsdal county. It is also the location of the Møre og Romsdal Agricultural Museum.

Damaging waves, although reduced in size, reached Gjermundnes.

References

Villages in Møre og Romsdal
Vestnes